The 1984 Castrol 500 was an endurance motor race staged at the Sandown Park circuit in Victoria, Australia on 9 September 1984. The event was open to Group C Touring Cars, competing in two engine capacity classes, Up to 3000cc and Over 3000cc. It also included a class for Group A cars which were to replace Group C cars in Australian Touring Car racing in 1985. The race, which was held over a distance of 503 km, was Round 3 of the 1984 Australian Endurance Championship.

This was the first Sandown endurance race where the distance was 500 km and the first of five races on the new 3.878 km (1.928 mi) long 'International Circuit'. Prior to 1984 the Sandown Enduro had been held over distances including: 6 Hours (1964–65), 3 Hours (1968–69), 250 miles (1970–75) and 400 km (1976-83), all held on the old 3.100 km (1.926 mi) circuit. The meeting also saw the opening of the new International standard Sandown Park with changes including the relocating of the pits from between turns 1 and 2 to a new $600,000 pit complex at the start of the main straight, and the lengthening and re-profiling of the circuit to the minimum length required for an International circuit of 3.9 km, primarily by the inclusion of an 800-metre infield section, which for the first time saw the circuit cross to the inside of the venue's horse racing track.

Qualifying
Nissan driver George Fury sat on pole in his Bluebird Turbo with a time of 1:46.2 for the new track. Alongside Fury in a brand new Roadways Racing Holden VK Commodore was Allan Grice who was only 0.1 behind. Filling out the second row of the grid was newly crowned Australian Touring Car Champion Dick Johnson in his "Greens-Tuf" Ford XE Falcon, and the Holden Dealer Team VK Commodore of Peter Brock. The third row of the grid consisted of the top two finishers from 1983. Winner Allan Moffat in his Mazda RX-7 and Jim Richards in the JPS Team BMW 635 CSI.

Fury's pole time remains the fastest ever recorded time by a touring car of the 3.878 km International Circuit.

1982 Australian Sports Car Champion Chris Clearihan, who was to have co-driven with David Grose in a Mazda RX-7, was excluded from the meeting after qualifying following an altercation in the pits with Allan Moffat in which punches were allegedly thrown. Moffat and Clearihan had tangled out on the circuit with a confrontation following in the pits. After Clearihan's exclusion, the 1983 Sports Car Champion Peter Hopwood who was driving in the final round of the 1984 Australian Drivers' Championship at the meeting, was given permission to take his place in the RX-7.

Race
Due to the new length of 500 km, teams were required to have at least two drivers per car as no one driver was permitted to complete the entire distance without a break. This saw most teams use their upcoming Bathurst pairings.

Driving with regular co-driver and HDT team manager Larry Perkins, Peter Brock won his 9th and last Sandown enduro. The pair finishing a lap ahead of the Moffat/Gregg Hansford RX-7 with the second HDT Commodore of John Harvey and new team recruit David Parsons finishing 3rd. Early race leader Dick Johnson suffered gearbox failure on lap 37, attributed to the increased strain from the tight new infield section, while pole sitter Fury was out on lap 32 with head gasket failure. The only other car to lead the race, the Roadways Racing VK Commodore of Grice/Steve Harrington, stopped with a broken gearbox while running 2nd on lap 103. Grice had the consolation on the day of not only winning the final round of the 1984 Australian GT Championship (and subsequently his third Sports Sedan/GT national title) in his Chevrolet Monza, but also setting the fastest lap of the Sandown 500 in his new Commodore before it expired. As this was the only Group C touring car race held on the new 3.9 km long international circuit, Grice's lap of 1:48.3 remains the category lap record for the circuit.

Dean Lindstrom and Larry Kogge won the Up to 3000cc class and finished 9th outright in their RX-7, 18 laps down on Brock/Perkins, while the winner of the new Group A category was Peter Williamson and Charlie O'Brien who finished 6th outright driving an ex-BTCC Toyota Celica Supra formerly driven by Win Percy.

Results

Top 10 Qualifiers

Race

Statistics
 Pole Position – #15 George Fury - Nissan Bluebird Turbo – 1:46.2
 Fastest Lap – #6 Allan Grice - Holden VK Commodore – 1:48.3 (new lap record)

References

Further reading
 Stewart Wilson & Max Stahl, Ford – The Racing History, 1989, page 312
 Stewart Wilson, Holden – The official Racing history, 1988, page 359
 Bill Tuckey, James Hardie 1000, 1984/85, pages 114–121

External links
 The Brock / Perkins Holden VK Commodore at the 1984 Castrol 500 Retrieved from www.brock05.com on 24 March 2009

Motorsport at Sandown
1984 in Australian motorsport
Pre-Bathurst 500